The Cascade Peaks are three summits in the Monte Perdido Range of the Pyrenees, culminating at  on the eastern peak. The peaks are located on the 3,000 m French-Spanish borderline crest.

Toponymy 
The central summit was named in honor of Henri Brulle.

Geography 
The peaks are part of the Monte Perdido Range above the Cirque de Gavarnie. The peaks are located in the Hautes-Pyrénées department, in the Midi-Pyrénées region of France, and in Huesca province, in the Aragon region of Spain.

Geology 
The summit is composed of massive algae sediments, miliolitic sediments (eolianite) and sandstone sediments from the Eocene and Oligocene periods.

References 

Mountains of the Pyrenees
Mountains of Hautes-Pyrénées
Mountains of Aragon
Pyrenean three-thousanders